William Walter Marsh (29 March 1877 – 12 February 1959) was a British fencer. He competed at four Olympic Games. He was twice British fencing champion, winning the sabre title at the British Fencing Championships in 1908 and 1909.

References

1877 births
1959 deaths
British male fencers
Olympic fencers of Great Britain
Fencers at the 1908 Summer Olympics
Fencers at the 1912 Summer Olympics
Fencers at the 1920 Summer Olympics
Fencers at the 1924 Summer Olympics
Sportspeople from Hastings